Jameleddine Limam (born 11 June 1967) is a Tunisian former professional footballer who played as a forward.

He represented Tunisia at the 1994 and 1996 African Cup of Nations, as well as the 1988 Olympic Games.

He is now a football agent.

References

External links
 
 
 

1967 births
Living people
Footballers from Tunis
Tunisian footballers
Association football forwards
Tunisia international footballers
Olympic footballers of Tunisia
Footballers at the 1988 Summer Olympics
1994 African Cup of Nations players
1996 African Cup of Nations players
Belgian Pro League players
2. Bundesliga players
Saudi Professional League players
Stade Tunisien players
Standard Liège players
Eintracht Braunschweig players
Ittihad FC players
Club Africain players
Tunisian expatriate footballers
Tunisian expatriate sportspeople in Germany
Expatriate footballers in Germany
Tunisian expatriate sportspeople in Belgium
Expatriate footballers in Belgium
Tunisian expatriate sportspeople in Saudi Arabia
Expatriate footballers in Saudi Arabia